Novosyolovka is a rural locality (a khutor) in Alexeyevsky District, Belgorod Oblast, Russia. The population was 42 as of 2010. There is 1 street.

Geography 
Novosyolovka is located 31 km southeast of Alexeyevka (the district's administrative centre) by road. Aleynikovo is the nearest rural locality.

References 

Rural localities in Alexeyevsky District, Belgorod Oblast
Biryuchensky Uyezd